Charles Edward Hunt (born February 1, 1951 in St. Augustine, Florida) was a linebacker in the National Football League who played for the San Francisco 49ers in 1973 and the Tampa Bay Buccaneers in 1976. He attended Samuel W. Wolfson High School and then Florida State University before being drafted in the 10th round, 253rd overall, of the 1973 NFL Draft by the 49ers.

References

Living people
San Francisco 49ers players
Tampa Bay Buccaneers players
1951 births
American football linebackers
Florida State Seminoles football players